Elliniko is a suburban city in southcentral Athens.

Elliniko or Ellinikon ("Hellenic, Greek") may also refer to the following places in Greece:

 Ellinikon International Airport, Elliniko
 Hellinikon Olympic Complex
 , a village in Farres municipal unit
 Elliniko, Arcadia, a village in Gortynia municipality
 , a seaside village in Tyros municipal unit
 , a village in Argos municipal unit
Elliniko, Corinthia, a village in Evrostina municipal unit
Elliniko, Ioannina, a village in the Ioannina regional unit
Elliniko, Kilkis, a village in the Kilkis regional unit
Elliniko, Laconia, a village in Laconia

See also
 Aglianico or Ellenico, an Italian grape of Greek origin
 Ellinika, the romanized name for the Greek language
 Ellinika, Aetolia-Acarnania, a village in Aetolia-Acarnania
 Ellinika, Euboea, a village in Euboea regional unit